This is a list of members of the South Australian Legislative Council from 1944 to 1947.

 LCL MLC Edward Holden, whose term did not expire until 1950, resigned on 8 January 1947, two months before the 1947 Council elections. The vacancy for the remainder of Holden's term was filled by Frank Perry on 8 March, alongside the other class, whose terms would expire in 1953.

References
Parliament of South Australia — Statistical Record of the Legislature

Members of South Australian parliaments by term
20th-century Australian politicians